(calqued as necropants, literally "corpse britches") are a pair of pants made from the skin of a dead human, which are believed in Icelandic witchcraft to be capable of producing an endless supply of money. It is highly unlikely these pants ever existed outside of folklore.

Ritual

The ritual for making necropants is described as follows:

References

External links

 "Necropants", Eric Grundhauser, Atlas Obscura

Icelandic folklore
Icelandic culture
Witchcraft in Iceland
Trousers and shorts
Human trophy collecting